Lusia may refer to:

People
 Lusia gens, minor family in ancient Rome
 Lusia Harris (1955–2022), American basketball player
 Lusia Strus (born 1969), American writer and actress

Other uses
 Lusia (Attica), Greece
 Lusia, Veneto, Italy
 Lusia, also known as adrapsa, a genus of moths of the family Erebidae

See also 
 Lucia (disambiguation)
 Luzia (disambiguation)